The 20th congressional district of Illinois was a congressional district for the United States House of Representatives in Illinois.  It was eliminated as a result of the 2000 Census. It was last represented by John Shimkus who was redistricted into the 19th district.

List of members representing the district

References 

 Congressional Biographical Directory of the United States 1774–present

20
Former congressional districts of the United States
1883 establishments in Illinois
Constituencies established in 1883
2003 disestablishments in Illinois
Constituencies disestablished in 2003